El Nido, officially the Municipality of El Nido, is a 1st class municipality in the province of Palawan, Philippines. According to the 2020 census, it has a population of 50,494 people.

A managed resource protected area, it is known for its white-sand beaches, coral reefs, and limestone cliffs, as well as for being the gateway to the Bacuit archipelago.

History
El Nido has been inhabited by humans since early 2680 BC, or even up to 22,000 years ago. This was confirmed by the fossils and burial sites, dating back to the Late Neolithic Age, that can be found in many caves and excavation sites surrounding the municipality, particularly in Dewil Valley's Ille Cave in New Ibajay. Chinese traders had been regularly visiting the area of Palawan for its edible birds' nests during the Song Dynasty (960-1279). The island was mentioned in Chinese records of 1225. Chau Ju-Kua, a trade commissioner of the port of Chuan wrote about the island, Pa-Lao-Yu or Land of Beautiful Harbors in his book Chu Fan Chi.

The town traces its roots from a small Tagbanwa village called Talindak. Sometime in the 16th century, waves of migrants from Cuyo Islands came here to settle. In the 1800s, the Spaniards arrived, and they moved to the part where the present-day Población and Mabini are located. The first Spanish families were the Canovas, Vázquez, Ríos, and Rey. In 1890, the Spaniards renamed it Bacuit. At the time, the center of the town was Cabigsing, then known as Inventario. Chinese families moved into the area about the same period, first settling in Langeblangeban. The first Chinese settlers were named Lim, Chin, Liao, Edsan, Ambao, Que-Ke, Lim Piao, Yu His, Pe Phan, and Pe Khen.

During the Spanish colonization of the Philippines, the town was under the jurisdiction of the Municipality of Taytay, which was the capital of the former Province of Calamianes from 1818, and the Province of Castilla, the area of what is now known as northern Palawan, from 1858. It remained part of Taytay until 1916 when it formally became an independent municipality. The new municipality was then known as Bacuit.

On June 17, 1954, Republic Act No. 1140 was approved changing the name of the town from Bacuit to its present name El Nido after the edible nests of swiftlets (collocalia fuciphaga), found in the crevices of its limestone cliffs. These nests, nido in Spanish, the main ingredient for the gourmet nido soup, are being sold at approximately US$ 3,000 per kilogram.

In 1957, the following barrios were created:
 Villa Paz comprising the sitios of New Igabas, Candolay, Malapaho, Mabeñgeten, Dewel, Nalbekan, and Lapia;
 Bebeladan comprising the sitios of Mainlong, Bolabod, Balete, Culiong, Codongnon, Vigan, Pagawanen, Langeblangeban, Talulap, Bocboc, Miadiao, Avirawan, Pita, Deboluan, Balay-Bacaco, Kiminawit, Pamontonan, Simpian, Binabanan, Tegas, and Pinacpanacan;
 Bagong-Bayan comprising the sitios of Manogtog, Cadleman, Pinagtual, Omao, Nami, Tebey, Bato, Tuñgay, Cataaban, and Lomocob;
 Pasadeña comprising the sitios of Lamoro, Cagbatang, Bulalacao, Pinañganteñgan, Quinawañgan, Nagbaclao, Colantod, Loblob, and Badiang;
 Sibaltan comprising the sitios of Turatod, Buluang, Santa Monica, Senodioc, Laolao, Caboñgan, Tapic, Panian, Guitan, Loro, and Nagcalasag;
 Barotuan comprising the sitios of Taberna, Locaroc, Nagpan, Yocoton, Calitang, Wawa, Makinit, Canoling, Mabañgaon, and Mapeldeten;
 San Fernando comprising the sitios of Panian, Madorianen, Dipnay, Maubog, Guenleng, Palabuayan, Parañgaycayan, San Pablo, and Olac-olacan; and,
 Villa Libertad comprising the sitios of Calelenday, Taolili, Boloc, Inigtan, Mepague, Matolatolaon, Dao, Batbat, Madacotdacot, Nasigdan, Semenled, Bancalen, and Cagbanaba. In the same year, the barrio of Oton was renamed to Mabini.

Geography

It is in the northernmost tip of mainland Palawan and is bordered by the Linapacan Strait in the north, the Sulu Sea in the east, and the South China Sea in the west. El Nido includes 45 islands and islets,  each with its own unique geological formations.

Together with Sulu Archipelago, Sabah, and South China Sea, El Nido, being part of Palawan, is located in the tectonically active and seismically active Sunda Plate,  a plate that is entirely separate from the Philippine Mobile Belt to which the rest of the Philippines belongs. The Permian to Paleogene rocks and limestone cliffs of El Nido are similar to those that can be found in Ha Long Bay in Vietnam, Guilin in China, as well as Krabi in Thailand, all of which are part of the Sunda Plate.

Barangays
El Nido is politically subdivided into eighteen barangays. Four of these are situated in the Población (town proper) and are also known by their respective zones.

 Bagong Bayan
 Buena Suerte (Zone II)
 Barotuan
 Bebeladan
 Corong-corong (Zone IV)
 Mabini (formerly Oton)
 Manlag
 Masagana (Zone III)
 New Ibajay
 Pasadeña
 Maligaya (Zone I)
 San Fernando
 Sibaltan
 Teneguiban
 Villa Libertad
 Villa Paz
 Bucana
 Aberawan

Climate

The climate in El Nido is distinguished by two seasons: generally dry, from December to May, and wet, from June to November. April and May are typically the driest, while the heaviest rainfall occurs around August. The Northeast wind blows from December to March, occasionally interchanging with the North wind from December to February. The Southwest wind is felt from June to October while the East wind, the mildest of all winds, blows during April and May.

The coolest temperatures are usually experienced during January, while the hottest temperatures are felt in April and May.

Demographics

The first town census of 1918 showed El Nido having a population of 1,789. In the period between 1980 and 1990, the population grew up to 18,832.  Based on the 2000 census, the annual growth rate is 3.58%. This is higher than the average annual population growth rate for the whole country for the periods 1990 to 2000 and 2000 to 2007, which was only 2.34% and 2.04%.

According to the 2007 census, El Nido has a population of 30,249 people in 6,311 households in its eighteen barangays. Eighty-five percent of the population are living in the rural barangays, while only fifteen percent of them are in the Población area.

Ethnic Groups
The original settlers of El Nido were the Tagbanwas and Cuyunons. Throughout the centuries, there has been a constant migration of Tagalogs, Hiligaynon, Bicolanos, Ilocanos, Chinese and Spaniards. There are also a small number of Japanese and Koreans. Intermarriage between ethnic and linguistic groups is not uncommon in El Nido.

Languages
The main language is Filipino, which is largely based on Tagalog. In addition, many people are very proficient in English, Hiligaynon, other Visayan languages, and Bicolano. A small but significant percentage of the population speaks or comprehends Cuyonon, the native language of the Cuyo Islands and most parts of Palawan.

Economy

The main industries of El Nido are fishing, agriculture and tourism, being a popular diving location. Edible nest-gathering is also economic activity, although it is seasonal. Coconut, palay, cashew, banana, and mango are its major products.

As a tourist destination, El Nido has been included in Condé Nast Travelers list of  "20 Most Beautiful Beaches in the World," CNNgo has called it the Best Beach and Island destination in the Philippines for its "extraordinary natural splendor and ecosystem."

Government

El Nido is governed by a Mayor and a Vice Mayor, who are elected to three-year terms. The Mayor is the executive head and leads the municipality's departments to execute the municipal ordinances and improve public services. The Vice Mayor heads the legislative council consisting of eight councilors, more commonly known as Sangguniang Bayan members. The Municipal Council is in charge of creating the municipality's policies in the form of Ordinances and Resolutions.

Seal
The municipality seal shows a silhouette of the territory of El Nido inside an armor-shaped picture. The famous marble and limestone cliffs represent the nestling ground of the swiftlets. Behind it is the oil rig, representing the areas within its administrative boundaries that are found to be rich in oil and natural gas such as the Malampaya Sound, which is 50 kilometers within its borders, and the Cadlao Oilfield in Bacuit Bay area. At the bottom of the picture is the rice field, with the carabao head superimposed at the center, and on the other side, the sea, with the fish and the squid in situated the middle, representing farming and fishing, the two main industries of its people.

Protected Area status

Establishment
In 1984, the then Ministry of Natural Resources issued Administrative Order No. 518, establishing a  maritime area in El Nido as a turtle sanctuary. In 1991, the rest of Bacuit Bay, including its island and islets, was proclaimed by the Philippine government as a marine reserve. A year later, by Administrative Order No. 14 Series of 1992 of the Department of Environment and Natural Resources, this area was expanded even more. In 1998, its status was elevated to that of a protected area, and it included even the terrestrial ecosystem of El Nido and portions of Taytay.

Extent and scope
The so-called El Nido-Taytay Managed Resource Protected Area is the largest marine sanctuary in the entire Philippines. The Protected Area status accords the areas of El Nido and portions of its neighboring town of Taytay a place among the eight priority sites in the country in need of conservation. The Protected Area covers a total of 903.21 square kilometers, of which 40% are terrestrial and 60% marine.

The provincial government has mobilized its citizenry to actively participate in various environmental conservation and protection programs, such as the "Bantay Gubat" for forest protection, and the "Bantay Dagat" for marine life preservation.  Patrolling within the Protected areas, especially in the marine zones is regularly conducted with the help of the World Wildlife Fund - Philippines that allocates funds to support the said activity. Another logistic support is by the concerned municipal governments. The Palawan Council for Sustainable Management (PCSD) provides legal assistance during the litigation of cases filed by the Protected Area Office (PAO).

As a protected area, the Philippine government needs approximately US$ 180,000 annually to protect and manage its natural resources. Tourists are encouraged to pay US$ 0.50 per day as a conservation fee for the duration of their visit to the Municipal Tourism Office or the Office of the Protected Area Management Board (PAMB), which are housed in the Municipal Building in Calle Real. This was embodied in the PAMB Resolution No. 08 series 2000 from the National Integrated Protected Area Program (NIPAP) of the Department of Environment and Natural Resources (DENR).

El Nido, one of the country's most diverse ecosystems, is protected for its unique flora, fauna, and pristine geologic formations. These include:
 limestone cliffs, the home of the swiftlets
 50 white sand beaches
 5 types of forest (the lowland evergreen rainforests found in the mainland and islands such as Miniloc, Lagen, and Pangulasian; semi-deciduous forests; forests over limestone; beach forests; and, the mangrove forests found mostly around major rivers and creeks in the mainland)
 3 major marine habitats
 16 endemic and 10 threatened species of birds (including the Palawan hornbill, the Palawan shama, the Palawan tit, Palawan scops owl, and the Palawan peacock pheasant)
 6 species of marine mammals endemic to Palawan (including dolphins and its native dugong)
 The Palawan tree shrew, the Palawan stink badger, the Palawan spiny rat, the Palawan anteater, and the northern Palawan tree squirrel
 4 species of endangered marine turtles (hawksbill, olive ridley, leatherback and green sea turtles)
 100 species of corals, 45 of which belongs to the genera of hard corals
 813 species of fish

Infrastructure

Transportation

Air

El Nido Airport also known as Lio Airport is the primary and sole airport serving the town of El Nido.

Roads
The main roads of El Nido are organized around a set of radial and circumferential roads that radiate and circle in and around the town proper and its rural barangays. Its interconnected roads are connected to the major highway that leads to Puerto Princesa, Palawan's capital. Daily Buses and jeepneys depart at San Jose Terminal in Puerto Princesa for El Nido. Tricycles are used for short-distance trips around the town proper.

The 60 km national road between Taytay and El Nido was rehabilitated, and this has helped boost tourism and business activity in the area.

Seaports and piers
The main port in El Nido, which is under the jurisdiction of the Philippine Ports Authority (PPA), is located in Buena Suerte (Zone II), although several small and accessible wharves, such as the San Fernando pier, are being used in other rural barangays. Several ferries and other sea vessels owned by Atienza Shipping Lines and San Nicholas Shipping Lines have regular trips from Manila to El Nido.

Utilities
The Población area is part of the service areas of electric utility, Palawan Electric Cooperative (PALECO), a division of the National Power Corporation operating with .423 megawatts of electricity. Other barangays use solar panels and electric generators. The island resorts generate their own electricity. Water services are accessible in protected water tables and facilities. Ten percent (10%) of the population can avail of the 'Level II Water System', or communal faucet, by the municipal government, while the majority of them are still dependent on deep wells and natural springs. Internet services are available in a few establishments with wireless broadband access.

Education
El Nido has more than ten public elementary and secondary schools located in most of its barangays. El Nido Central School and El Nido National High School, which are both located at the Poblacion, have the largest facilities and number of students, among these schools. Recently, the Palawan State University opened its El Nido campus in New Ibajay, offering extramural programs and studies. Some of the lower-grade schools are located in Calitang. Calitang Elementary School, Pasadeña Elementary School, Barutoan Elementary School, Bucana Elementary School, and Lamoro Elementary School.

See also

El Nido Airport
List of renamed cities and municipalities in the Philippines

References

External links

Palawan Council for Sustainable Development: Palawan Flora and Fauna
 [ Philippine Standard Geographic Code]
Local Governance Performance Management System

Municipalities of Palawan
Protected areas of the Philippines
Beaches of the Philippines
Tourist attractions in Palawan